William Vernon (1719–1806) was a New England trader.

William Vernon may also refer to:
William H. Vernon (1944–2014), American businessman and politician
William Vernon (MP) (died 1605), MP for Maldon
William Tecumseh Vernon (1871–1944), American educator, minister and bishop in the African Methodist Episcopal Church
William de Vernon
William Vernon (died 1467), Knight-Constable of England

See also
Bill Vernon (1937–1996), American radio DJ
Will Vernon, a character on the TV soap opera One Life to Live